Diabolic Inventions and Seduction for Solo Guitar, Vol. 1: Music of Astor Piazzolla is an album by Italian-American jazz fusion and Latin jazz guitarist Al Di Meola, released in 2007.

Track listing
All songs by Ástor Piazzolla
"Campero" – 4:50
"Poemo Valseado" – 4:27
"Tangata del Alba" – 5:18
"Adios Nonino" – 4:52
"Tema de Maria" – 6:00
"Milonga del Angel" – 4:58
"Romantico" – 4:35
"Milonga Carrieguera" – 3:08

Personnel
Al Di Meola – guitar, handclapping, djembe
Hernan Romero – handclapping, djembe

References

2007 albums
Al Di Meola albums